Barkat Gourad Hamadou (1 January 1930 – 18 March 2018) was the Prime Minister of Djibouti from 2 October 1978 until 7 March 2001.

Political career
Hamadou was a member of the Afar ethnic group and was born in Tew'o, Dikhil Region, in the southwest of Djibouti. Prior to Djibouti's independence, he was a member of the Senate of France; he was first elected as a Senator on 26 September 1965, and he was re-elected on 22 September 1974. After Djibouti became independent in June 1977, Hamadou served in the government as Minister of Health. President Hassan Gouled Aptidon then appointed him as Prime Minister on 30 September 1978, and his first government was formed on 2 October 1978; in addition to serving as Prime Minister, Hamadou held the Ports portfolio in that government.

Hamadou was the first candidate on the candidate list of the ruling People's Rally for Progress (RPP) for the District of Djibouti in the December 1992 parliamentary election. Following the election, Hamadou was reappointed as Prime Minister by Gouled on 4 February 1993, with a government composed of 18 ministers (including Hamadou). A peace agreement with the Front for the Restoration of Unity and Democracy (FRUD), an Afar rebel group, was signed in 1994; Hamadou played an important role in this agreement. A new government that included members of FRUD was formed on 8 June 1995. Hamadou remained Prime Minister in this government and was additionally assigned the development portfolio.

Hamadou was the first candidate on the RPP/FRUD candidate list for the District of Djibouti in the December 1997 parliamentary election. After this election he was again reappointed as Prime Minister, with a 17-member government (including Hamadou), on 28 December 1997. After Gouled was succeeded by Ismail Omar Guelleh in May 1999, Hamadou was retained as Prime Minister.

On the night of 9 March 2000, Hamadou was admitted to the French army hospital in Djibouti due to heart trouble. He was then moved to Paris, where he was hospitalized from March 2000 to October 2000. Although he was re-elected as vice-president of the RPP in early 2001, he subsequently submitted his resignation as Prime Minister to President Guelleh on 6 February 2001 due to poor health. Guelleh accepted the resignation, and Hamadou was succeeded by Dileita Mohamed Dileita on 7 March 2001. Hamadou later resigned as RPP vice-president due to his health and was succeeded in that post by Dileita on 3 July 2003.

Death
Hamadou died 18 March 2018 in Paris, aged 88.

References

1930 births
2018 deaths
Djiboutian politicians
Members of the National Assembly (Djibouti)
French Senators of the Fifth Republic
Prime Ministers of Djibouti
People from Djibouti (city)
People from Dikhil Region
People's Rally for Progress politicians
Afar people
Senators of French East Africa